Canada was one of the countries to provide the most aid and relief for Hurricane Katrina.  They provided ships, supplies, volunteers, search-and-rescue teams, and more. It has also accepted some evacuees to stay in Canada.

Official Canadian government response

The official response by the Government of Canada to the Gulf coast disaster came on September 2, following discussions between Public Safety and Emergency Preparedness Canada and the U.S. Federal Emergency Management Agency.  The federal government announced it was deploying a task force comprising three warships—,  and —along with the Coast Guard vessel  and three Sea King helicopters and one BO-105 helicopter to the area.

The Canadian Forces also provided several Griffon helicopters and crews to the New England States at the request of the United States Coast Guard whose search and rescue helicopters from that area have been assigned to Gulf Coast SAR operations. Canadian aircraft were deployed as part of a North American Free Trade Agreement (NAFTA) military assistance pact.

The task force was organized under the name "Operation UNISON" and involved over 1,000 personnel from the Canadian Forces and Canadian Coast Guard who were placed under the operational command of their American counterparts who were coordinating relief operations. A precedent was established with a similar humanitarian aid response by the Government of Canada following Hurricane Andrew when the Auxiliary Oil Replenishment (AOR) ship  participated in "Operation TEMPEST", providing relief supplies and personnel in southern Florida and the Bahamas.

The ships and aircraft had the capacity to relocate people and deliver a broad range of supplies, including tents, cots, water containers and items such as men's and women's toiletries, sun screen and insect repellent.  At the same time, the Public Health Agency of Canada was in contact with the U.S. Department of Health and Human Services and offered whatever support was required. "We are really prepared to operate on all fronts as requested and as co-ordinated by the United States," said Prime Minister Paul Martin.

In an interview on National Public Radio, Canada's Ambassador to the United States said that in addition to the basic desire to help a neighbor in need, many Canadians also remember the ancestors of Louisiana's Cajuns were expelled from what would become Canada by the British in the 18th century, which he felt gave an extra historical dimension to Canadians' desire to help the people of Louisiana during the recovery operation.

On September 4, following a request from U.S. Department of Health and Human Services, the Government of Canada announced it was prepared to send thousands of beds, blankets, surgical gloves and dressings and other medical supplies. The Government of Canada announced it would also send 35 divers to help with the rescue effort. One of the divers' tasks would be to inspect levees.

On September 5, a team of 35 military divers was deployed from CFB Halifax and CFB Esquimalt to Pensacola, Florida. They were tasked with assisting their U.S. Navy counterparts to clear navigational hazards, including unsecured and sunken vessels and debris, and to inspect flood-damaged levees.

On September 6 the Operation UNISON task force of navy and coast guard ships departed Halifax Harbour for the U.S. Gulf Coast.  The naval ships arrived at Pensacola, Florida several days later, having been delayed by further tropical storm activity off the east coast of Florida.  The coast guard ship arrived several days later, due to its slower cruising speed.  The Operation UNISON task force unloaded relief supplies at Pensacola and was deployed to assist along the Mississippi coast.

On September 19 it was announced that the three warships from the Operation UNISON task force would be returning to Halifax, leaving CCGS Sir William Alexander to continue its mission of clearing navigation hazards and repairing buoys.  On September 28, the coast guard vessel was retasked to assist the National Oceanic and Atmospheric Administration in repairing the network of weather buoys along the Gulf of Mexico and Atlantic coasts of the United States, which had been severely damaged by the 2005 Atlantic hurricane season; these buoys are one of the most important tools for forecasting and gathering data from oceanic storms. CCGS Sir William Alexander returned to Canada on October 24.

Vancouver Urban Search and Rescue
One of the first things Canada did was to deploy Vancouver Urban Search and Rescue to Louisiana.  They arrived on a WestJet Airlines aircraft in Lafayette, Louisiana on the evening of August 31, 2005. Due to security and logistics issues in the disaster area surrounding New Orleans, the team started operations on September 3; they saved 30 people that day.  They were the first outside responders to arrive in St. Bernard Parish, beating American response teams.  By the time they returned to Vancouver on September 6, they had reportedly saved over 110 people.

Other help

 The Canadian Red Cross  launched an immediate nationwide appeal for donations to enable the organization to provide aid to its American counterpart.  37 Canadian Red Cross personnel were transported by Canadian military aircraft to assist with efforts in Houston, Texas; they were followed by dozens of other Red Cross personnel once the situation assessment was completed.  The American Red Cross asked Canadian Red Cross chapters in Quebec for cots for refugees staying at U.S. evacuation centres and other services were requested from chapters in Ontario.
 The Government of Nova Scotia donated $100,000 towards the Red Cross effort.  This was followed on September 8 when the Government of Alberta announced that it was donating $5 million to the Hurricane Katrina fund administered by former presidents Bush and Clinton.  The cheque was personally given by Premier Ralph Klein to former president Clinton during a visit to Alberta in October.
 Other provinces expressed interest in providing temporary housing to those left homeless.  Some residents of Nova Scotia, New Brunswick and Prince Edward Island offered shelter to the homeless survivors of hurricane Katrina.  Anne McLellan, the Minister of Public Safety and Emergency Preparedness, announced that her department was discussing with the U.S. National Security Advisor the possibility of Canadians billeting American storm evacuees. Big cities like Calgary, Ottawa, Vancouver, Toronto, and Montreal accepted 1,200 evacuees in all .
 Universities across Canada offered to take in university students from New Orleans whose studies have been interrupted.  Some institutions went so far as to offer full tuition scholarships and free room and board.
 Ontario Hydro, Hydro-Québec, and Manitoba Hydro, along with other electrical utilities, sent repair crews to assist in restoring electrical power service.
 Canada increased oil exports as requested by the IEA to help stabilize the world market in the wake of the crisis and its impact on North American oil production and refining capacity.
 On September 2 Air Canada participated along with U.S. member airlines of the Air Transport Association, in a voluntary airline industry initiative to support rescue and relief operations. Air Canada was the first foreign carrier to land in New Orleans delivering water and supplies and lifting victims to safety.
 On September 7, the Canadian Embassy started a Hurricane Katrina fund to support victims in the Gulf region.  Frank McKenna, Canadian ambassador to the United States, told Americans "you are our friends and together we are family – you do not suffer alone."

See also 
Canadaville, Louisiana
Hurricane Katrina
Hurricane Katrina disaster relief
Canada's response to the December 2004 Indian Ocean earthquake and tsunami
Canada's response to Hurricane Katrina
Canada's response to the May 2008 Sichuan earthquake
Canada's response to the January 2010 Haiti earthquake
Canada's response to the March 2011 Japan earthquake and tsunami
Canada's response to Typhoon Haiyan
Canada's response to the April and May 2015 Nepal earthquake

References

External links 
Canadian Forces Operation Unison
Statement by the Government of Canada, August 30
Statement by Canadian Prime Minister Paul Martin, August 31
Vancouver Urban Search and Rescue
 "Canuck navy heading to New Orleans", September 2
Nova Scotia (Canada) offers $100,000 for Hurricane Katrina Relief
Government of British Columbia (Canada) offers additional assistance
Government of Saskatchewan (Canada) offers support in wake of Hurricane Katrina
Government of Manitoba (Canada) offers support and sympathy to hurricane victims
Statement of the Government of New Brunswick (Canada) in the aftermath of Hurricane Katrina
Prince Edward Island (Canada) offers support to victims of Hurricane Katrina
Canadian Chief of Defence Staff General Rick Hillier meets media to discuss Canada's offer of assistance, September 1
"Canadians beat U.S. Army to New Orleans suburb"
Bush joins other Americans in thanking Canada for Katrina help
Katrina The Gulf Response, Coast Guard Magazine, Special Edition 2005

International responses to Hurricane Katrina
Canada–United States relations
2005 in Canada